Atra is a village in Elva Parish, Valga County in southeastern Estonia. Atra has a population of 46 (as of 1 January 2011).

The Tartu–Valga railway passes Atra on its eastern side, the nearest station is located in the neighbouring Palupera village.

Journalist, banker, and politician Christian Kaarna (1882–1943) was born in Atra.

References

Villages in Valga County